Mohamed Fadhloun (born 16 February 1994) is a French footballer who plays as a midfielder for Sedan.

Club career
Fadhloun played youth football with US Pont-de-Beauvoisin, Bourgoin-Jallieu, Grenoble and Annecy before signing with Bourg-Péronnas in Championnat National, with whom he gained promotion to Ligue 2 at the end of the 2014–15 Championnat National season. He made just two appearances in the 2015–16 Ligue 2 season, being kept out for long periods through illness, and signed for US Concarneau for the 2016–17 Championnat National season.

In June 2017 Fadhloun moved to Sedan, who had just been relegated to Championnat National 2. In the summer of 2018 he moved to Belgium, to Belgian First Amateur Division side Virton, where he helped them win promotion. In July 2019 he returned to France, signing for Lyon-Duchère (which became Sporting Club Lyon in June 2020) on a one-year contract, with an option for an additional year should the club win promotion to Ligue 2.

On 1 September 2021, he returned to Sedan.

Personal life
Born in France, Fadhloun is of Tunisian descent.

References

External links
 

Living people
1994 births
Association football midfielders
French footballers
French sportspeople of Tunisian descent
Ligue 2 players
Championnat National players
Championnat National 2 players
Football Bourg-en-Bresse Péronnas 01 players
US Concarneau players
CS Sedan Ardennes players
R.E. Virton players
Lyon La Duchère players
Sportspeople from Savoie
Footballers from Auvergne-Rhône-Alpes